The UEFA Plaque was a honorific award given by the Union of European Football Associations (UEFA) to those clubs that had won, at least once, the title in each of the three major international competitions organised by that confederation, namely the European Champions Cup, the Cup Winners' Cup and the UEFA Cup. It was officially established in late 1987 and its first award was given in the second half of the following year, with Italian Juventus being the club to be honoured. A second award was initially scheduled for the second half of 1992 in favour of Dutch side Ajax, but it was not conferred for unclarified reasons by the confederation after Spanish team Barcelona —who did not comply with the requirement imposed by UEFA— at the same time unsuccessfully applied to European football's governing body for such recognition, being subsequently discontinued.

Background 
Since 1971 to 1999, three international competitions organised by UEFA were disputed in Europe each season, which would be regulated by a single committee since 1972 and had defined dates in the international fixture calendar, so these were named since then by that governing body as its major tournaments in terms of prestige and by the mass media as "the three European cups" due the general level of all these was even. These competitions, named European Champions' Cup, Cup Winners' Cup and UEFA Cup given additionally points for the confederation coefficient since its introduction in 1979, being the first cited regarded as the most prestigious and the latter as the hardest to win in view of its unpredictability, its contestants' level and having different winning teams each season.

At the beginning of the 1984–85 season in European football, two clubs in the continent were in the running to become the first to complete this trio of competitions, having won at least two trophies out of three: Hamburg and Juventus, which competed in the UEFA Cup and in the European Champions' Cup, respectively, and required to win the trophy in those competitions to achieve this set; being the Italian team the only to do it at the end of that season.

In December 1987, the UEFA competitions' Organising Committee proposed, at Zürich, to the confederation's executive committee to be instituted an official award for those clubs that would have won at least once all three seasonal pan-European tournaments —a success called a posteriori by the confederation as "the European Treble"— and, after being ratified, it was announced to be given for the first time during the first official UEFA meeting of the following season which would be held five months latter. By the time of the announcement, only two clubs in Europe would complete all sweep of seasonal international trophies, equalling the Juventus' record, if they had won the title in the competition which participated: Anderlecht in European Champions' Cup and Milan AC in UEFA Cup during the 1987–88 season, but both were eliminated in the quarter-finals and in the second round, respectively. In a similar situation were both Ajax and Bayern Munich, who unsuccessfully participated in the 1988–89 UEFA Cup.

Italian mass media dubbed that recognition since it was conferred in July 1988, "Targa UEFA" by metonymy and synecdoche and with this name it was also known, by literal translation, outside the country.

Description 
The award consists of a rectangular silver plaque on which are superimposed silhouettes of three trophies that represent the tournaments mentioned, above a golden laurel wreath and the European football government body badge, also in gold. Also, the plaque have the following inscription in French, then the confederation's leading administrative language, which translated to English:

Recipients 
On 12 July 1988, at the beginning of the 1988–89 European competitions seeding held in Geneva (Switzerland), then UEFA president Jacques Georges presented the prize to then Juventus president Giampiero Boniperti.

In July 1992, after winning the European Champions' Cup, then FC Barcelona president Josep Lluís Núñez requested of UEFA a similar recognition, stating that his club had equalled Juventus' record, having won formerly the Cup Winners' Cup and the UEFA Cup. European football's governing body, now led by Lennart Johansson, who replaced Georges in the charge, rejected it because the Spanish club had never won the UEFA Cup proper, and UEFA does not recognize its predecessor, the Inter-Cities Fairs Cup, previously won by the Blaugrana, as an official competition. Eight months latter, Johansson proposed, unsuccessfully, to merge all three seasonal competitions in a unique pan-European championship which the better teams in the continent would be involved.

Since UEFA awarded Juventus with the UEFA Plaque, four other clubs have won the three seasonal European competitions: Ajax (1992, to whom the recognition was initially scheduled after their triumph in 1991–92 UEFA Cup, notwithstanding the confederation latter decided not to award them for unknown reasons), Bayern Munich (1996), Chelsea (2013), and Manchester United (2017).

See also 
 UEFA club competition records and statistics

Notes

References

Bibliography 
 

Plaque
Plaque
Awards established in 1987
1987 establishments in Switzerland
1987–88 in European football
1988–89 in European football
1992–93 in European football